Hyraceum is the petrified and rock-like excrement composed of both urine and feces excreted by the Cape hyrax (Procavia capensis, also referred to as the rock hyrax or dassie).

The rock hyrax defecates in the same location over generations, which may be sheltered in caves. These locations form middens that are composed of hyraceum and hyrax pellets, which can be petrified and preserved for over 50,000 years. These middens form a record of past climate and vegetation.

It is also a sought-after material that has been used in both traditional South African medicine and perfumery.

Hyraceum in perfumery 
The material hardens and ages until it becomes a fairly sterile, rock-like material (also referred to as "Africa Stone") that contains compounds giving it an animalic, deeply complex fermented scent that combines the elements of musk, castoreum, civet, tobacco and agarwood.  The material is harvested without disturbing the animals by digging strata of the brittle, resinous, irregular, blackish-brown stone; because animals are not harmed in its harvesting, it is often an ethical substitute for deer musk and civet, which require killing or inflicting pain on the animal.

Hyraceum in traditional South African medicine 
After it has been fossilized hyraceum has been used as a traditional folk medicine in South Africa for treating epilepsy. One clinical study of 14 samples of the material collected at various geographical locations in South Africa tested the material for its affinity for the GABA-benzodiazepine receptor, a neurologic receptor site that is effective in the treatment of seizures with benzodiazapines such as diazepam and lorazepam in Western medicine. Four of the hyraceum samples assayed positive for having an affinity for the receptor sites; however, extracts in water were inactive.

See also
 Tinnunculite

References

Animal waste products
Hyraxes
Perfume ingredients
Science and technology in South Africa
Traditional African medicine